Angel Eyes is a 2001 American romantic drama film directed by Luis Mandoki and starring Jennifer Lopez, Jim Caviezel, Terrence Howard, and Jeremy Sisto. Written by Gerald Di Pego, the film is about a mysterious man who finds himself drawn to a female police officer with whom he forms a relationship that helps each to deal with trauma from their past. The original music score was composed by Marco Beltrami. The film received ALMA Award Nominations for Outstanding Actress (Jennifer Lopez) and Outstanding Director (Luis Mandoki).

Plot
On a wet rainy night in Chicago, police officer Sharon Pogue is at the scene of a serious traffic accident holding the hand of one of the victims, pleading that he hold on and not give up. One year later, Sharon is frustrated with the men she dates, and has become estranged from her family for having her father arrested for beating her mother Josephine. Her father and brother, Larry, have never forgiven her, and her anger is affecting her police work.

A man known only as "Catch" wanders the streets of Chicago in a trance-like state, doing good deeds for strangers and neighbors. One day he sees Sharon at a diner and watches her from across the street, and she notices him watching her. Just then a car pulls up and blasts the diner with machine gun fire, and Sharon and her partner chase after the criminals. Sharon catches up with one criminal and in the ensuing struggle, he gets her gun and shoots her twice in the chest. Seeing that she is protected by her bulletproof vest, he prepares to shoot her in the head, but Catch jumps the man and tackles the thug. Sharon's partner arrives thereafter, knocking the gun away from the thug, saving her life. That night, Sharon and Catch meet at a tavern and have a drink. A grateful Sharon tries to learn more about Catch, but he does not talk about himself. Sharon invites him to her apartment, and after some awkward moments between the two, they share a kiss. Catch abruptly stops and leaves the apartment, leaving Sharon confused.

The next evening Sharon finds a dandelion taped to her mailbox with Catch's phone number. She calls and awkwardly invites him to breakfast at a coffee shop the next morning. When Sharon wakes up, she has second thoughts and calls Catch to cancel their breakfast date. Catch is already at the coffee shop and never gets the message. Upset at being stood up, he goes to Sharon's apartment and criticizes her for not showing up for her "appointment", and then storms out. Sharon follows him to his nearly empty apartment. Surprised at the living conditions, she demands to know more about him, but Catch refuses to reveal anything about his past. He only says that he is starting "from scratch".

Following the advice of his mother-in-law Elanora, Catch calls Sharon and apologizes, and the two continue seeing each other. They go on a lakeside picnic in a state park and share a romantic swim, after which they make passionate love on the shore. In the coming days, Catch is there to comfort her after a family confrontation. His positive influence begins to show in her police work. One night they go to a blues club, and after the band has played a number, Catch notices a trumpet, set on the bandstand. He picks up the trumpet and starts to play a soulful version of the tune "Nature Boy". As they're leaving, the owner approaches him, calling him "Steve Lambert", and asking where's he's been. Catch denies even knowing the man and walks away.

The next day, Sharon investigates the name Steven Lambert in the police files and discovers that he is the man whose hand she held at the site of a traffic accident a year earlier, and that Catch's wife and child died in the accident. She goes to the house he abandoned after the accident and learns that he was a jazz musician and that the accident occurred on his son's birthday, causing Catch to create a mental block. Wanting to help Catch heal from his emotional wounds, she tries to talk to him about the accident and takes him to the cemetery to see the graves of his family, but he gets very upset and walks away. Sharon visits Elanora who is actually Catch's former mother-in-law. Sharon is looking for some way of helping the man she loves, and Elanora encourages patience and tells Sharon that Catch will find his way in his own time.

At her parents' wedding vow renewal ceremony, Sharon tries talking to her father but he tells her that he feels like he doesn't have a daughter. As Sharon starts to leave, she stops and tells the videographer a wonderful story about her father playing with her and her brother when they were children. She is deeply moved by this memory. Her father overhears it and is also emotionally affected, but when Sharon looks at him, he turns away. Meanwhile, Catch finally goes to the cemetery and talks to his deceased wife and child, explaining how he remembers all the wonderful moments they shared. As Sharon leaves the reception, she sees Catch waiting by her car. They embrace and profess their love for each other. As they prepare to leave, Catch tells her that he'll drive.

Cast

 Jennifer Lopez as Sharon Pogue
 Jim Caviezel as Steven 'Catch' Lambert 
 Terrence Howard as Robby
 Jeremy Sisto as Larry Pogue
 Sônia Braga as Josephine Pogue
 Victor Argo as Carl Pogue
 Monet Mazur as Kathy Pogue
 Shirley Knight as Elanora
 Daniel Magder as Larry Jr.
 Guylaine St-Onge as Annie Lambert
 Connor McAuley as Max Lambert
 Jeremy Ratchford as Ray Micigliano
 Peter MacNeill as Lieutenant Dennis Sanderman
 Eldridge Hyndman as Jamal
 Kari Matchett as Candace
 Michael Cameron as Charlie
 Dan Petronijevic as Street Punk
 Dog as Bob

Production

Filming
Principal photography started on May 8, 2000 and finished in early August that same year. Aaron Eckhart was cast as Steven 'Catch' Lambert but left a month before filming began.

Filming locations
Angel Eyes was filmed in the following locations: 
 Chicago, Illinois, USA 
 Elora, Ontario, Canada 
 Toronto, Ontario, Canada

Although the story is set in Chicago, several very clear shots of the Toronto skyline, including Toronto's very recognizable CN Tower, appear in the film, along with other recognizable Toronto landmarks, such as the Honest Ed's storefront, the Sam the Record Man neon light and a TTC streetcar. The scenes in and around Sharon's parents home were filmed at the Playter Farmhouse, an historic building near Danforth Avenue in Toronto. Some scenes were filmed in the village of Elora, Ontario, at Elora Gorge.

Reception

Critical response
Upon its theatrical release, Angel Eyes received mixed reviews. On the review aggregator web site Rotten Tomatoes, the film holds a 32% positive rating from critics based on 133 reviews. The site's consensus states: "Though the earlier part of the movie suggested something more, the movie turns out to be nothing more than a schmaltzy romance."

In his review in the Chicago Sun-Times, Roger Ebert gave the film three of four stars and applauding the performance of Jennifer Lopez, whom he describes as "the real thing, one of those rare actresses who can win our instinctive sympathy. She demonstrates that in Angel Eyes. Ebert noted that although the film is a cop movie, "its real story doesn't involve the police, it involves damaged lives and the possibility that love can heal." Ebert concludes:

In his review in the San Francisco Chronicle, Mick LaSalle called the film "a rare thing—a well-acted character study of a hardworking woman, by a screenwriter (Gerald DiPego) and a director with enough integrity to dispense with the usual Hollywood distractions." LaSalle concluded:

In his review in The New York Times, Stephen Holden focused his critique on the casting, writing, "Watching these two share some awkward smooches that are supposed to transport them over the moon is a little like imagining Jane Russell and Montgomery Clift in a steamy clinch." Holden concludes:

Box office
In North America, the film opened at #4 in its opening weekend and grossed $24,174,218 domestically. All UK versions were cut to obtain a 15-rating. Warner Bros. had to remove the aggressive use of graphic language or the film would have been rated 18. The film was a box office bomb, ultimately grossing $29,715,606 worldwide, well below its $38 million budget.  Available on Netflix streaming in November 2018.

Awards and nominations
 2002 ALMA Award Nomination for Outstanding Actress in a Motion Picture (Jennifer Lopez)
 2002 ALMA Award Nomination for Outstanding Director in a Motion Picture (Luis Mandoki)
 2003 ASCAP Award for Most Performed Song from a Motion Picture for "Good Morning Beautiful" (Todd Cerney, Zachary Lyle) Won
 2002 Golden Raspberry Award Nomination for Worst Actress (Jennifer Lopez)

References

External links

 
 
 
 
 

2001 films
2001 romantic drama films
American romantic drama films
Fictional portrayals of the Chicago Police Department
Films about domestic violence
Films directed by Luis Mandoki
Films produced by Elie Samaha
Films scored by Marco Beltrami
Films set in Chicago
Films shot in Chicago
Films shot in Toronto
Franchise Pictures films
Morgan Creek Productions films
Warner Bros. films
2000s English-language films
2000s American films